Eupithecia luteonigra is a moth in the  family Geometridae. It is found in Peru.

The forewings are buff, crossed obliquely by lines, which in places are darkened by blackish scales, the costal area above subcostal vein always remaining buff. The hindwings are whiter, crossed by six curved darker lines, marked black on the veins.

References

Moths described in 1907
luteonigra
Moths of South America